Bacigalupo is an Italian surname. Notable people with the surname include:

Ana Mariella Bacigalupo, Peruvian anthropologist
Giuseppe Bacigalupo (1744–1821), Italian painter 
Manlio Bacigalupo (1908–1977), Italian association football goalkeeper
Manuel Bacigalupo (1916–1965), Peruvian cyclist
Massimo Bacigalupo (born 1947), Italian filmmaker, translator, essayist and literary critic
Nélida María Bacigalupo (born 1924), Argentine botanist
Renato Bacigalupo (1908–1979), Italian Olympic swimmer
Rolando Bacigalupo (1914–1989), Peruvian Olympic basketball player
Scott Bacigalupo, American lacrosse goaltender
Valerio Bacigalupo (1924–1949), Italian association football goalkeeper, brother of Manlio
Paolo Bacigalupo, Peruvian Musician

Italian-language surnames